A list of films produced in Egypt in 1937. For an A-Z list of films currently on Wikipedia, see :Category:Egyptian films.

References

External links
 Egyptian films of 1937 at the Internet Movie Database
 Egyptian films of 1937 elCinema.com

Lists of Egyptian films by year
1937 in Egypt
Lists of 1937 films by country or language